Protoperidiniaceae is a family of dinoflagellates belonging to the order Peridiniales.

Genera:
 Amphidiniopsis Woloszynska
 Apsteinia T.H.Abé   
 Archaeperidinium E.G.Jørgensen

References

Dinophyceae
Dinoflagellate families